Human tower is a performance variation of gymnastic formation. Together with the human pyramid, it is exhibited frequently at the climax of the performance. In gymnastics, human tower is the highest and largest mounting. On the shoulder of the components of the base layer, put the feet of components of the second floor. In the same way, the components of higher floors are accumulated. The mounting is performed in sitting postulate. After the conclusion of the mounting, the tower stands up from lower floor to upper ones.

As a general term, the expression human tower is often confused with human pyramid. This item shows the human tower of gymnastic formation.

See also 
 Castell
 Muixeranga
 Human pyramid

References 

 浜田靖一 『イラストで見る組体操・組立体操』　(Gymnastic Formation shown by illustrations). Daishûkan Publisher, Japan, 1996, 305p.. (In Japanese)

Gymnastics